Stevie Wishart is an English composer, improviser, and performer on the hurdy-gurdy and medieval violin.  Mainly involved in contemporary music, she has also had a career in early music and has edited and recorded the complete works of Saint Hildegard of Bingen, as well as performing music from the repertoire of the medieval troubadours, trouvères and the Cantigas de Santa Maria, with the medieval group Sinfonye, which she led.

Wishart was educated at Cambridge, Oxford and the Guildhall School of Music, studying composition and electronic music at the University of York with Trevor Wishart and Richard Orten. She then studied improvised and aleatoric music with John Cage and David Tudor. Later she was a member of performance ensemble Machine for Making Sense with Chris Mann, Rik Rue, Amanda Stewart and Jim Denley.

Selected works

"Last Dance" a Baroque Tango – BBC Proms, Royal Albert Hall, London, performed by the Dunedin Consort (world premiere)

“Voicing the Dawn” – commissioned for  Ex Cathedra, premiere of version for solo voices – Hereford Cathedral, premiere for version for full choir – Birmingham Cathedral.

En Fugue Music – sound-track for – A Light's Travelogue by Els van Riel.

Out of the Mists – for harpsichord and piano. 3rd August 2017. A tone poem for harpsichord and piano inspired by the mists of the River Dart. World premiere performed by Joanna Macgregor – piano, Jane Chapman – harpsichord at the Dartington International Summer School.

A journey between cities in sound – Eurostar – soprano, clarinet & bass clarinet, harp, double-bass. Commissioned by the Hermes Ensemble, premiere St John’s Smith Square, London.

Rough with the Smooth – Concerto for double bass in the form of a concerto grosso – For string orchestra, harp, theorbo, and harpsichord. Commissioned by the Orchestra of the Age of Enlightenment. 2015. Premiered in the Queen Elizabeth Hall, London, May 2015.

The Seasons – Cantata – for SATB choir. 2013/2014. Commissioned by the Ipswich Choral Society. Premiere Snape Maltings, Aldeburgh, 2014. With special thanks to Maureen Fell.

Canti del Paradiso – for 3 upper voices, small-harp, and hurdy-gurdy. 2012. Commissioned for La Fede di Dante – il canto xxiv del paradiso, at the Chiesa del Gesu, Rome in the presence of His Eminence Cardinal Ravasi Presidente del Pontificio Consiglio della Cultura of the Vatican, Rome (and live for RAI TV).

Out of this World – for SATB Choir. 2011 Commissioned by BBC Radio 3 for the BBC Singers, premiered in the BBC PROMS on 27 August 2011 at the Cadogan Hall, performed by the BBC Singers and Sinfonye. Each movement may be performed separately.

Iced – for chamber orchestra, theremin, and live computer-generated sound, sound-transformation, and multi-speaker sound-diffusion, 2004. Commissioned by Ensemble Musiques Nouvelles, Belgium and Art Zoyd, Transfrontalier de Productions et de Créations Musicales, Valenciennes & Brussels 2004–2005.

Selected recordings

Composition

Strahlender Himmel – (lieder for soprano and piano), on Lieder und Balladen von Helen Buchholtz (1877–1953), Solo Musica, Cat No: SM309, https://www.prestomusic.com/classical/products/8611897--lieder-und-balladen-von-helen-buchholtz-1877-1953,

Three carols:

1.Of Mary, a maide/ Te Deum Laudamus 3:17 (alt title Of Mary, a maide/ Te Deum Laudamus)

2.Lets be merry as bird on berry 5:10

3.Lullaby for Freya (Tàladh Chrìosda) 4:21

Nova Nova Contemporary Carols from St Catharine’s. Performed by the Choirs of St Catharine’s College Cambridge dir. Edward Wickham, Resonis Classics (CDRES10159) 2015 http://www.resonusclassics.com/nova-nova-contemporary-carols-st-catharines-cambridge

Happy Song – on Patterns of Love compilation (voice 0799439747999) 2015, https://store.cdbaby.com/cd/voice92

Vespers for St Hildegard – CD Decca/Universal (4765117).

The Sound of Gesture – For Violin, Sensors and Computer performed & composed by Stevie Wishart/ with video artist Yvonne Mohr SW001CD-DVD.

Improvisation

VIOLET – Mikroton CD 4 https://www.discogs.com/Dafeldecker-Kurzmann-Tilbury-Wishart-Dafeldecker-Kurzmann-Tilbury-Wishart/release/1905309.

The Act of Obsession Becomes the Object Itself – by Machine for Making Sense, Jim Denley, Rik Rue and Amanda Stewart, Stevie Wishart.

The Compass, Log and Lead – ensemble composed performed: Stevie Wishart, Fred Frith and Carla Kihlstedt (Intakt, Zurich) https://intaktrec.bandcamp.com/album/the-compass-log-and-lead.

Aquatic track 2 as guest with The Necks.

References

BBC Radio 3, BBC Proms, Proms Saturday Matinee 3: Hildegard, Britten, Sir Harrison Birtwistle & Stevie Wishart Broadcast 27 August 2011.
Hyperion Records, Stevie Wishart artist page at Hyperion Records
Cambridge University.

External links
Stevie Wishart Artist's page Stevie Wishart official website on LoganArts Management
abc: The Music Show with Andrew Ford
Stevie Wishart Soundcloud: hurdygurdy the quietus compilation
Intercultural Communication through Practice – Bath Spa University
Stevie Wishart stelt cd/dvd The Sound of Gesture voor in Brussel
Macrotransiency Stevie Wishart
Pang – music by Stevie Wishart
Improvisation in the Round: Stevie Wishart
Music getting in the medieval mood with her blend of Hurdy Gurdy and Techo Pop, Stevie Wishart straddles the worlds of folk, rock and the avant-garde. Nick Kimberley reports
Passionate about Performance – Cambridge University
https://psn2018.org/wp-content/uploads/sites/17/2018/07/PSN-2018-Conference-Programme-Booklet.pdf Performance Studies Network Conference 2018
Kings Place events 
Stevie Wishart – The Sound of Gesture – Interview
Abc Sound Vault podcast
Composing Birds blog – Stevie Wishart
BBC Radio 3: The Early Music Show – Echoes of Past and Present: Stevie Wishart
"Over the next horizon" : excerpt from THE SOUND OF GESTURE by composer and performer STEVIE WISHART
Happy Song by Stevie Wishart (2014)
The Quietus: Th'infernal Drone: In Praise Of The Hurdy-Gurdy – Jennifer Lucy Allan
Logan Arts Management Sound Excerpts
Stevie Wishart – The Sound of Gesture
Exeter Cathedral – Summer holiday online concert
Machine for Making Sense, 1994–2008

1959 births
English composers
English classical violinists
Living people
Alumni of the University of York
21st-century classical violinists
Women classical violinists
Intakt Records artists
Emanem Records artists